Mendipathar is one of the 60 Legislative Assembly constituencies of Meghalaya state in India. It is part of North Garo Hills district and is reserved for candidates belonging to the Scheduled Tribes. It falls under Tura Lok Sabha constituency.

Members of Legislative Assembly
The list of MLAs are given below

|-style="background:#E9E9E9;"
!Year
!colspan="2" align="center"|Party
!align="center" |MLA
!Votes 
|-
|1972
|bgcolor="#00FFFF"|
|align="left"| Indian National Congress
|align="left"| Sibendra Narayan Koch
|1087
|-
|1978
|bgcolor="#CEF2E0"|
|align="left"| All Party Hill Leaders Conference
|align="left"| Beninstand G. Momin
|1494
|-
|1983
|bgcolor="#CEF2E0"|
|align="left"| All Party Hill Leaders Conference
|align="left"| Beninstand G. Momin
|3330
|-
|1988
|bgcolor="#CEF2E0"|
|align="left"| Hill People's Union
|align="left"| Beninstand G. Momin
|5809
|-
|1993
|bgcolor="#00FFFF"|
|align="left"| Indian National Congress
|align="left"| Frankestien W. Momin
|6969
|-
|1998 
|bgcolor="#00FFFF"|
|align="left"| Indian National Congress
|align="left"| Frankestien W. Momin
|6046
|-
|2003
|bgcolor="#CEF2E0"|
|align="left"| United Democratic Party
|align="left"| Beninstand G. Momin
|7756
|-
|2008
|bgcolor="#00FFFF"|
|align="left"| Indian National Congress
|align="left"| Frankestien W. Momin
|4647
|-
|2013
|bgcolor="#00B2B2"|
|align="left"| Nationalist Congress Party
|align="left"| Marthon Sangma
|5307
|-
|2018
|bgcolor="#00FFFF"|
|align="left"| Indian National Congress
|align="left"| Marthon Sangma
|9347  
|}

Election results

2023

2018

See also
List of constituencies of the Meghalaya Legislative Assembly
 North Garo Hills district
 Tura (Lok Sabha constituency)

References

Assembly constituencies of Meghalaya
North Garo Hills district